José Enrique Ortiz Cortés (born 16 November 1998) is a Colombian professional footballer who plays as a defender for Colombian club Atlético Junior.

References

External links
José Ortíz at Soccerway
José Ortíz at Football Database EU

1998 births
Living people
Colombian footballers
Deportivo Pasto footballers
Atlético Morelia players
Liga MX players
Association football defenders
Colombian expatriate footballers
Expatriate footballers in Mexico
Colombian expatriate sportspeople in Mexico